Belay glasses are eyeglasses with prismatic lenses that are used by belayers in rock climbing to avoid the neck strain commonly associated with belaying.

Belaying involves a person standing on a stable platform below a rock climber controlling the tension and friction of the climber's rope. Since this activity requires craning one's neck to look up at the climber, a common malady named "belayer's neck" can occur. The prismatic lenses of the belay glasses are arranged so as to bend light from above through total internal reflection into the observer's eye, allowing the belayer to observe the climber while maintaining a comfortable head/neck position.

The design based on the eyeglasses frame provides for a split field of vision:
 the central field through the lenses, providing a vertical view to the climber;
 the peripheral field around the sides of the lenses, allowing the belayer to remain aware of their surroundings.

The first belay glasses were invented in 2007 by climber Albi Schneider from Germany.

References 

Climbing equipment